Church of the Holy Venerable Mother Parascheva is a Serbian Orthodox church located in Banovci, Vukovar-Syrmia County in eastern Croatia.  The neoclassical church was built in 1819. The church and its parish are under jurisdiction of the Eparchy of Srem which is based in Sremski Karlovci in neighbouring Serbia. Within the Eparchy the church in Banovci is organized within the Šid region with the seat at the Church of St. Nicholas, Šid with majority of local Banovci priests residing in Šid due to the absence of the local priestly residences in the village. Most of the other Serbian Orthodox churches in Eastern Slavonia are under the ecclesiastical jurisdiction of Eparchy of Osječko polje and Baranja. The church is dedicated to Saint Parascheva of the Balkans.

Lutheran Christmas Mass of 1859
First Danube Swabians settled in Banovci in 1859 where they were relying on the support of local Serbian Orthodox priest Uroš. As the northern part of historical region of Syrmia was predetermined for German Catholic colonists, and settlement in the biggest part of Slavonian Military Frontier was almost impossible, German Protestants had to settle in the bordering region between these two jurisdictions. As there was no Lutheran church in Banovci at that time, German Protestant settlers asked priest Uroš to hold a Christmas Mass for them under the Eastern Orthodox liturgical rite. Priest Uroš have refused this request as it was contrary to Orthodox canonical rules, yet he offered them to organize Christmas Celebration on their own in the St. Petka church. He also attended their celebration which impressed him but he did not lead the prayer.

Gallery

See also
 Serbs of Croatia
 Evangelical Reformed Church in Šidski Banovci
 List of Serbian Orthodox churches in Croatia

References

Churches completed in 1818
19th-century Serbian Orthodox church buildings
Banovci
Protestantism in Croatia
19th-century Lutheranism
Eastern Orthodox ecumenical and interfaith relations